Cheremske Nature Reserve is a protected nature reserve of Ukraine that covers forest and wetlands of the Western Polesia region, in the northwest of the country.  The area is one of high biodiversity because of the varied habitat in transitional ecological zones.  The reserve is in the administrative district of Manevychi in Volyn Oblast

Topography
The terrain is flat and boggy, with fluvial deposits of the Ice Age.  In places the peat is 10 meters thick.

Climate and ecoregion
The climate of Cheremske is Humid continental climate, warm summer (Köppen climate classification (Dfb)).

The reserve is located in the Central European mixed forests ecoregion, a temperate hardwood forest covering much of northeastern Europe, from Germany to Russia.

Flora and fauna
The reserve is approximately 65% forested and 35% wetlands.  The Cherem transitional sedge-sphagnum bogs is one of the largest and best preserved in Ukraine.

Public use
As a strict nature reserve, Chermeske's primary purpose is protection of nature and scientific study.  Public access is limited: mass recreation and construction of facilities is prohibited as are hunting and fishing.  There are several "ecological" educational trails for supervised public use.

See also
 Lists of Nature Preserves of Ukraine (class Ia protected areas)
 National Parks of Ukraine (class II protected areas)

References

External links
 Boundaries of Cheremske Nature Reserve on OpenStreetMap.org 

Nature reserves in Ukraine